Orchard Lake Village is a city in Oakland County in the U.S. state of Michigan.  The population was 2,375 at the 2010 census.

The city is mostly surrounded by West Bloomfield Township, with a small northeast border with Keego Harbor. About 40% of the city's total area is water, with the main geographic feature being Orchard Lake, which occupies about 30% of the city's total area.

Orchard Lake Village is home to St. Mary's Preparatory and SS. Cyril and Methodius Seminary, in addition to the Orchard Lake Country Club and Pine Lake Country Club. It is also the home of Orchard Lake St. Mary's Preparatory and Orchard Lake Schools, formerly Michigan Military Academy.

Geography

Orchard Lake, Cass Lake, and Upper Straits Lake are all within or partially within the city limits.  Terrain is rolling and high.  Orchard Lake Village surrounds Orchard Lake, the third-largest lake in Oakland County (after Cass Lake, which is also partially in Orchard Lake Village, and Kent Lake). The city is surrounded by West Bloomfield Township, except for the northeast boundary along Keego Harbor.

Demographics

2010 census
As of the census of 2010, there were 2,375 people, 802 households, and 665 families living in the city. The racial makeup of the city was 83.9% White, 6.4% African American, 7.4% Asian, 0.2% from other races, and 2.1% from two or more races. Hispanic or Latino of any race were 1.1% of the population.

There were 802 households, of which 33.9% had children under the age of 18 living with them, 75.7% were married couples living together, 4.1% had a female householder with no husband present, 3.1% had a male householder with no wife present, and 17.1% were non-families. 14.5% of all households were made up of individuals, and 6.8% had someone living alone who was 65 years of age or older. The average household size was 2.78 and the average family size was 3.08.

The median age in the city was 46.9 years. 23.2% of residents were under the age of 18; 7.5% were between the ages of 18 and 24; 16.1% were from 25 to 44; 35.7% were from 45 to 64; and 17.5% were 65 years of age or older. The gender makeup of the city was 53.6% male and 46.4% female.

2000 census
As of the census of 2000, there were 2,215 people, 750 households, and 648 families living in the city. The racial makeup of the city was 91.87% White, 3.84% African American, 0.14% Native American, 2.66% Asian, 0.09% from other races, and 1.40% from two or more races. Hispanic or Latino of any race were 0.90% of the population.

8.8% of Orchard Lake's population reported ancestries that were characterized as "Assyrian/Chaldean/Syriac" by the U.S. Census, making Orchard Lake Village the community with the highest percentage of people in that category of any place in the United States.

There were 750 households, out of which 40.3% had children under the age of 18 living with them, 79.7% were married couples living together, 3.9% had a female householder with no husband present, and 13.5% were non-families. 9.6% of all households were made up of individuals, and 2.8% had someone living alone who was 65 years of age or older.  The average household size was 2.95 and the average family size was 3.18.

In the city, the population was spread out, with 26.9% under the age of 18, 6.0% from 18 to 24, 21.7% from 25 to 44, 34.4% from 45 to 64, and 11.0% who were 65 years of age or older.  The median age was 43 years. For every 100 females, there were 104.3 males.  For every 100 females age 18 and over, there were 107.4 males.

The median income for a household in the city was $121,126, and the median income for a family was $126,058. Males had a median income of $83,680 versus $41,250 for females. The per capita income for the city was $67,881.  About 0.6% of families and 0.5% of the population were below the poverty line, including none of those under the age of eighteen or sixty-five or over.

Education
Almost all of Orchard Lake Village is within the West Bloomfield School District.

One portion is instead in Walled Lake Consolidated Schools.

Also, there is another school called St. Mary's Preparatory, which is a Catholic Preparatory for boys.

Notable people
J. Sumner Rogers, founder of Michigan Military Academy
Bob Seger, American rock musician

References

External links

City of Orchard Lake Village

Cities in Oakland County, Michigan
Metro Detroit
Populated places established in 1928
1928 establishments in Michigan
Assyrian-American culture in Michigan